Korina Paola Adamou (born 6 July 2002) is a Cypriot footballer who plays as a defender for First Division club Geroskipou and the Cyprus women's national team.

References

External links

2002 births
Living people
Cypriot women's footballers
Women's association football defenders
Cyprus women's international footballers
Middle Eastern people of Filipino descent